Eschata xanthorhyncha is a moth in the family Crambidae. It was described by George Hampson in 1896. It is found in Sri Lanka.

Description
Its wingspan is about 32 mm. The forewings have a somewhat produced and acute apex. In the male, the head and thorax are whitish. Palpi orange, banded with white. Forelegs orange fringed with white. Tarsi banded with orange. Forewings with area between the postmedial and submarginal lines evenly irrorated (sprinkled) with black scales. Hindwings fuscous black. Cilia whitish. Ventral side with basal two-thirds of wings suffused with fuscous black.

References

Chiloini
Moths described in 1896